Vassa Zheleznova is a play by Russian writer Maxim Gorky. He wrote and published the play in 1910. It was not performed until 1936 after Gorky wrote a new version in 1935.

The play was the basis of several films in the Soviet Union, e.g. the 1953 film of the same name, and in France and Germany.

See also
Mother (1906)

External links

First version, 
Second version, 

1910 plays
1936 plays
Plays by Maxim Gorky